Perrecy-les-Forges is a commune in the Saône-et-Loire department in the region of Bourgogne-Franche-Comté in eastern France. It played a significant regional influence in the 14th-16th centuries.

The name of the commune indicates that the metallurgic industry has played a role in its economy. A forge from the 17th century, and former coal mines are among the places of interest of the commune.

The church of Perrecy-les-Forges, built during the 12th century, is listed as a Monument historique since 1862 by the French Ministry of Culture.

See also
Communes of the Saône-et-Loire department

References

Communes of Saône-et-Loire
Charolais, France